Cherokee Independent School District is a public school district based in the community of Cherokee, Texas (USA). The district is located in southern San Saba County.

Cherokee ISD has a single campus, Cherokee School, that serves students in grades Kindergarten through twelve.

Academic achievement
In 2009, the school district was rated "academically acceptable" by the Texas Education Agency.

References

External links
Cherokee ISD

School districts in San Saba County, Texas